The Insert key  (often abbreviated Ins) is a key commonly found on computer keyboards.

It is primarily used to switch between the two text-entering modes on a personal computer (PC) or word processor:
 overtype mode, in which the cursor, when typing, overwrites any text that is present in the current location; and
 insert    mode, where the cursor inserts a character at its current position, forcing all characters past it one position further.
The insert/overtype mode toggling is not global for the computer or even for a single application but rather local to the text input window in which the Insert key was pressed.

Overview
On early text-based computing environments and terminals, when the cursor is in overtype mode, it was represented as a block that surrounded the entire letter to be overstruck; when in insert mode, the cursor consisted of the vertical bar that is highly common among modern applications, or a blinking underline under the position where a new character would be inserted.

On modern keyboards, the Insert key is only present on the control block between the typewriter keys and the numeric keypad. Originally an insert key was provided in the typewriter key block beside a delete key; both have been removed in favor of a double-sized 'backspace key'. The key was often maligned as unnecessary and more likely to be accidentally than intentionally activated.

When keymapping using Octal code, the desired key may be set by sending  to perform the "insert" function.

Application usage 
Modern word processing applications operate in insert mode by default, but can still be switched to overtype mode by pressing the Insert key. Some applications indicate overtype mode with a letter-width cursor box, as opposed to the standard narrow cursor; however, others use the narrow cursor for both modes, and indicate overtype with an "OVR" indicator in the status bar.

The Insert key, when pressed along with Control or Shift, can also be used to copy or paste in Microsoft Windows. This behavior comes from the Common User Access standard.

Screen readers use the insert key for hotkeys for reading text, speaking formatting information, or opening the screen reader's configuration menu or window.

References

Computer keys